Bagnolo may refer to:

Places in Italy
Bagnolo Cremasco, in the Province of Cremona 
Bagnolo del Salento, in the Province of Lecce
Bagnolo di Po, in the Province of Rovigo 
Bagnolo in Piano, in the Province of Reggio Emilia
Bagnolo Mella, in the Province of Brescia 
Bagnolo Piemonte, in the Province of Cuneo
Bagnolo San Vito, in the Province of Mantova
Bagnolo, Santa Fiora, in the Province of Grosseto

Other uses
Litsea garciae, a tree native to Southeast Asia locally called bagnolo

See also
Bagnoli (disambiguation)